Audun Skorgen (born 26 February 1967) is a Norwegian jazz musician (upright bass and bass guitar).

Career 
Skorgen is a graduate of the Jazz program at Trondheim Musikkonsevatorium (2000). He specialized in improvisation, and has a distinctive bottling bass technique. In addition to being an active freelance musician, he has also been a county musician, first in Finnmark and later in Sunndal, Møre og Romsdal, from 2008 as part of "Møremusikarane".

Skorgen has also collaborated within the bands like 'Velvet Lounge Orchestra', including Marita Røstad (vocals and rhodes), Stian Omenås (trumpet), Håvard Stubø (guitar) and Erik Nylander (drums), and 'Frode Grønmyr Quintet' including Grønmyr (gitar), Peter Wergeni (saxophones), Norvall Dahl (piano) and Simon Kongshaug (drums).

Discography 

 With Marita Røstad
2007: Silent Sunday (Magica Records)

References

External links

Audun Skorgen på kontrabass picture on Mediabasen.no

1967 births
Living people
Musicians from Ålesund
20th-century Norwegian male musicians
21st-century Norwegian male musicians
20th-century Norwegian bass guitarists
21st-century Norwegian bass guitarists
20th-century Norwegian upright-bassists
21st-century Norwegian upright-bassists
Avant-garde jazz musicians
Jazz double-bassists
Male double-bassists
Male jazz composers
Norwegian jazz upright-bassists
Norwegian male bass guitarists
Norwegian jazz bass guitarists
Norwegian jazz composers
Norwegian University of Science and Technology alumni